Reginald VelJohnson (born Reginald Johnson; August 16, 1952) is an American actor. He is best known for playing police officer characters, such as Carl Winslow on the sitcom Family Matters, which ran from 1989 to 1998, and LAPD Sergeant Al Powell in the films Die Hard and Die Hard 2.

Early life
VelJohnson was born Reginald Johnson on August 16, 1952, in the Queens borough of New York City, the son of Eva, a nurse’s aid, and Dan, a hospital attendant. His father left the family, which included Reginald's brother Barry, when Johnson was 13 years old. Their mother subsequently married John Reilly. Johnson attended Benjamin N. Cardozo High School . He later obtained a Bachelor of Fine Arts in theater from New York University, where he had a chance to work with Joseph Papp's Black/Hispanic Shakespeare Company, in which Morgan Freeman and CCH Pounder were among his fellow actors. Early in his acting career, he changed his name from Reginald Johnson (his birth name) to Reginald VelJohnson. He later said he changed the spelling "because I wanted a name people would remember."

Career
VelJohnson is known for playing police officers in films and on television. His early career included a brief appearance in Ghostbusters (1984) as a municipal corrections officer, and an appearance in Crocodile Dundee (1986) as a limo driver. VelJohnson played alongside Tom Hanks, as Det. David Sutton, in Turner & Hooch (1989). He would also play an ambulance driver in Remo Williams: The Adventure Begins (1985) in which he was credited by the stage name Ivory Ocean.

VelJohnson had his breakthrough role as Sgt. Al Powell in the 1988 film Die Hard. VelJohnson was hired after Gene Hackman, originally hired to play the role, became unavailable, and producers decided to hire a relatively unknown actor for the part. He came from New York to California to film it for nine months, which was so long that he just ended up residing in California permanently thereafter. He also later reprised the character in the 1990 sequel Die Hard 2. VelJohnson again portrayed Sgt. Powell in the GameCube video game title, Die Hard: Vendetta, in 2002.

In 1989, VelJohnson was cast as the memorable police officer and family patriarch Carl Winslow in the ABC (later CBS) sitcom Family Matters, alongside Jo Marie Payton, who played his wife Harriette Winslow. It was a spinoff of the popular show Perfect Strangers on which he appeared only once, though Harriette appeared as a re-occurring guest star. He starred on the show until it ended in 1998. Since the end of Family Matters, VelJohnson has done mostly voice and guest star work. VelJohnson has made guest appearances in several TV shows, including The Equalizer, Diagnosis: Murder, Twice in a Lifetime, Will & Grace, Monk, CSI: Crime Scene Investigation, Eve, Crossing Jordan, The Parkers, That's So Raven, and Bones. He also had a minor role in the 2002 film Like Mike.

In 2007, he appeared in the short films Reverse, Nerve Endings, and Time Upon A Once which were made during the reality show On the Lot. The following year, he appeared as the "Sgt. Al Powell" character from the Die Hard series in an episode of NBC's Chuck titled "Chuck Versus the Santa Claus", as the cousin of Big Mike (Mark Christopher Lawrence). In 2010, VelJohnson started a recurring role as Principal, later Superintendent, Strickland on the Disney sitcom I'm in the Band and also Funnyordie.com's short HBO film titled Just 3 Boyz starring Tim Heidecker, Eric Wareheim, and Zach Galifianakis. He has also appeared in the comedy film, The Formula, starring alongside Brandon Baker and Sasha Jackson. He played air traffic controller Bob Abbot in the 2012 film Air Collision.

In 2021, VelJohnson voiced Principal Winslow in the animated adaptation of the comic Invincible. In both the comic and the television series, the main character attends a high school named after the actor, and the character itself is named after his previous role of Carl Winslow from Family Matters. VelJohnson also voices several minor characters in the series. He later reprised his role as David Sutton on Disney's Turner & Hooch.

In January 2023, VelJohnson began appearing in advertisments for Progressive as "TV Dad," a parody of his previous Carl Winslow role.

Personal life
As of 2009, VelJohnson had homes in Raleigh, North Carolina, and Los Angeles, and resided primarily in Oceanside, New York. He has never married and has no children.

Filmography

Film

Television

Video games

References

External links
 
 
 
 

1952 births
Living people
African-American male actors
American male film actors
American male stage actors
American male television actors
Benjamin N. Cardozo High School alumni
Male actors from New York City
New York University alumni
People from Queens, New York
20th-century American male actors
21st-century American male actors
20th-century African-American people
21st-century African-American people